CCN1 may refer to:

 Cyclin A2 - a protein in the cyclin family
 CYR61 - a protein in the CCN family